Jianwen Hu (born 12 August 1987) is a Paralympic Chinese athlete competing in T38 classification track and field events. He won the gold medal at the Men's 100 metres T38 event at the 2016 Summer Paralympics, with 10.74 seconds.

References

Living people
Medalists at the 2016 Summer Paralympics
Paralympic gold medalists for China
Athletes (track and field) at the 2016 Summer Paralympics
Paralympic athletes of China
Chinese male sprinters
Chinese male long jumpers
1987 births
Paralympic medalists in athletics (track and field)
21st-century Chinese people